Engine Company No. 3 located at 1416 Arch Street in the Central Northside neighborhood of Pittsburgh, Pennsylvania, was built in 1877.  It was added to the List of City of Pittsburgh historic designations on April 12, 1995.

References

City of Pittsburgh historic designations
Government buildings in Pittsburgh
Defunct fire stations in Pennsylvania
Fire stations completed in 1877
1877 establishments in Pennsylvania